Steve Flowers is a political columnist, commentator, and historian. Flowers writes a weekly syndicated column, Inside the Statehouse, which is published in 66 newspapers across the State of Alabama and has a circulation of over 450,000. Flowers is also the author of Of Goats and Governors - Six Decades of Colorful Alabama Political Stories, which was published by New South Books in 2015.

Early life and education 
Flowers is a native of Troy, Alabama. Beginning at age 12, Flowers served as a page in the Alabama House of Representatives. After graduation from high school, Flowers attended the University of Alabama. As a student at the university, Flowers served in various leadership roles, including the Student Government Association, where he served in the Senate. Flowers received his bachelor's degree from the University of Alabama in 1974 in political science and history.

Alabama House of Representatives (1982–1998) 
At age 30, Flowers was elected to the Alabama House of Representatives by the people of Pike County. In his 1982 campaign, Flowers received more votes than any other candidate for public office in the history of Pike County. Flowers quickly made a name for himself in the Legislature, and was named by "Alabama Magazine" as the Most Outstanding Freshman in the Alabama House of Representatives. Flowers overwhelmingly won reelection four times, and left the Legislature on his own volition in 1998. In the sixteen years he served in the State Legislature, Flowers maintained a record of perfect attendance, was named the Most Ethical Member of the House of Representatives, and was voted by his colleagues as the Most Outstanding Member of the Alabama House of Representatives in 1992.

"Inside the Statehouse" 
Three years after leaving the Legislature, Flowers began writing a weekly column on Alabama politics - "Inside the Statehouse." Flowers' column quickly became the most widely-read political column in the State of Alabama. Today, "Inside the Statehouse" is syndicated in 66 newspapers, and is read by approximately 450,000 Alabamians, making Flowers the most widely-read and authoritative figure on Alabama politics.

Political commentary 
Flowers' commentary on Alabama politics is not limited to his weekly column. As Alabama's preeminent political authority, Flowers often appears on various television stations across the State of Alabama, analyzing recent events in Alabama politics. In addition, Flowers has also provided analysis on Alabama politics for national news outlets, including CBS, ABC, PBS, MSNBC, and the British Broadcasting Network. Flowers also appears on Alabama Public Radio, and hosts a thirty-minute television show, "Alabama Politics," which airs in the Montgomery viewing area. Those who have appeared on "Alabama Politics" include Senator Richard Shelby, Governor Robert Bentley, Attorney General Luther Strange, and State Treasurer Young Boozer. Flowers appears on several local news outlets, including:
 The University of Alabama News Network - WVUA 23 (Tuscaloosa)
 Alabama News Network - WAKA and WNCF (Montgomery)
 WIAT 42 News (Birmingham)
 Fox 10 News (Mobile)
 WTVY Channel 4 News (Dothan)

Of Goats and Governors 
In addition to his column, Flowers published his first book in 2015, entitled Of Goats and Governors - Six Decades of Colorful Alabama Political Stories. The book chronicles Alabama's rich political history through stories of its most colorful political players.

References

Historians of the United States
American political commentators
American male non-fiction writers
People from Troy, Alabama
Writers from Alabama
21st-century American historians
American columnists
University of Alabama alumni
Members of the Alabama House of Representatives
Living people
Year of birth missing (living people)